Sukhadia Stadium is a multi purpose stadium in Bhilwara, Rajasthan. The ground is mainly used for organizing matches of football, cricket and other sports. The stadium has capacity of 16,000 persons and City End, Airport End are two end of the stadium.

The stadium has hosted a Ranji Trophy match  from 1964 when Central Zone cricket team played against West Zone cricket team.

The stadium has hosted a Deodhar Trophy match  from 1964 when Central Zone cricket team played against West Zone cricket team until 1998 but since then the stadium has hosted non-first-class matches.

References

External links 
 Cricketarchive
 Cricinfo
 Wikimapia

Sports venues in Rajasthan
Bhilwara
Cricket grounds in Rajasthan
Sports venues completed in 1995
1995 establishments in Rajasthan
Football venues in Rajasthan
20th-century architecture in India